Maniac (also known as Sex Maniac) is a 1934 American black-and-white exploitation horror film directed by Dwain Esper and written by Hildagarde Stadie, Esper's wife, as a loose adaptation of the 1843 Edgar Allan Poe story "The Black Cat", with references to his "Murders in the Rue Morgue". Esper and Stadie also made the 1936 exploitation film Marihuana.

The film, which was advertised with the tagline "He menaced women with his weird desires!", is in the public domain.

A restored version was made available in 1999, as part of a double feature with another Esper film, Narcotic! (1933). John Wilson, the founder of the Golden Raspberry Award, named Maniac one of the "100 Most Amusingly Bad Movies Ever Made" in his book The Official Razzie Movie Guide. Maniac has received negative reception since its release, being the first film considered the worst ever made and is an oft-cited example of pornographic films.

Plot 

Don Maxwell is a former vaudeville impersonator who's working as the lab assistant to Dr. Meirschultz, a mad scientist attempting to bring the dead back to life. When Don kills Meirschultz, he attempts to hide his crime by "becoming" the doctor, taking over his work, and copying his appearance/mannerisms. In the process, he slowly goes insane.

The "doctor" treats a mental patient, Buckley, but accidentally injects him with adrenaline, which causes the man to go into violent fits. In one of these fits, Buckley kidnaps a woman, tears her clothes off, and rapes her. Buckley's wife discovers the body of the real doctor and blackmails Don for turning her husband into a zombie. The ersatz doctor turns the tables on her by manipulating the woman into fighting with his estranged wife, Alice Maxwell, a former showgirl. When the cat-breeding neighbor, Goof, sees what's going on, he calls the police, who stop the fight and, following the sound of Satan the cat, find the body of the real doctor hidden behind a brick wall.

Cast
 Bill Woods as Don Maxwell
 Horace B. Carpenter as Dr. Meirschultz
 Ted Edwards as Buckley
 Phyllis Diller as Mrs. Buckley
 Thea Ramsey as Alice Maxwell
 Jenny Dark as Maizie
 Marvel Andre as Marvel
 Celia McCann as Jo
 John P. Wade as Embalmer
 Marian Blackton as neighbor

Cast notes
 Several key cast members in the film are uncredited, most notably the cat-farming neighbor Goof, the detective, and Maria Altura, the woman whom Dr. Meirschultz brings back to life. The actress who doubled for Altura in the brief nude scene has also not been identified.
 Horace B. Carpenter was a producer, director and actor from the silent era who generally portrayed whitehaired characters in Westerns once sound emerged.
 This is the only film that Bill Woods performed in. He later became a makeup artist, working in film and television until 1968.
 Marian Blackton is sometimes reported, incorrectly, as appearing in male drag as the neighbor who catches and breeds cats. She plays a female neighbor who is questioned by the detective. The male actor who plays Goof has not been identified. Blackton was the sister of Maniac assistant director and daughter of J. Stuart Blackton, founder of Vitagraph Studios and the father of American animation.
 The actress named Phyllis Diller in this film is of no relation to the comedian Phyllis Diller.
 Celia Jiminez, billed under her married name of Celia McCann, was also a Spanish-language voice artist, having the Spanish-language voice for Minnie Mouse and other female cartoon characters.  Her daughter, also named Celia McCann, is a movie extra, and her granddaughter is comedian Julie Brown.

Production

The film was shot on a minuscule budget of $7,500, according to the film's financier's son, and like many of director Dwain Esper's films was self-distributed on the exploitation roadshow circuit. After initial disappointing returns (and no reviews in the media of the time), the film was retitled Sex Maniac with great success. It became notorious for a scene in which one character strangles a cat and then eats its eyeball.

The footage that is superimposed over the scenes where the actor (having shot the mad scientist) is descending into madness while bricking his victim inside a wall, originated from the 1922 Danish-Swedish film Häxan.

Reception and legacy
Many reviewers praise it as being "so bad it's good", such as Rob Gonsalves of eFilmCritic.com, who called it "A true trash masterpiece." Leonard Maltin awarded the film the lowest rating of BOMB, calling it "[a] Typically delirious Esper Schlockfest— filmed mostly in somebody's basement". Danny Peary believes that Maniac is the worst film ever made. Chicago Tribune critic Michael Wilmington, in a review for the 2005 horror film Chaos, wrote: "I wouldn't say Chaos is the worst movie I've ever seen. There are some voyages into ineptitude, like Dwain Esper's anti-classic Maniac, that defy all reason." A Rotten Tomatoes editorial by Michael Adams placed the film on a list of 25 movies so bad they're unmissable, and the Italian Vanity Fair included it on its list of the 20 worst movies ever.

The film was first released on DVD by Alpha Video March 18, 2002.

It was also spoofed by RiffTrax on November 24, 2009.

See also
List of films in the public domain in the United States
Nudity in film
Reefer Madness (1936)

References

External links 

 
 
 
 
 
 
 Maniac at BadMovies.org
 Bad Movie Report: Maniac – Review of the film

1934 films
1934 horror films
1930s American films
1930s English-language films
1930s exploitation films
1930s science fiction horror films
American black-and-white films
American exploitation films
American psychological horror films
American science fiction horror films
American zombie films
Films about cats
Films about rape
Films based on The Black Cat
Films directed by Dwain Esper
Mad scientist films
Articles containing video clips